Hesjevika is a village area in Lavangen Municipality in Troms og Finnmark county, Norway. It is located in the eastern side of the Lavangen fjord, between the villages of Å and Tennevoll.  There are about 50 houses in this village area.

References

Villages in Troms
Lavangen
Populated places of Arctic Norway